Mark D. Stillwagon is a retired United States Air Force brigadier general who served from 1985 until 2017.  He served in various operational and staff assignments at the squadron, wing, center, major command, Combat Support Agency, and joint levels while on active duty and as a member of the Air National Guard and United States Air Force Reserve. Deployments include Venezuela as part of a cooperative Combat Search and Rescue training effort and Incirlik Air Base, Turkey, in support of Operation Northern Watch. In the wake of 9/11, the general was assigned to the Joint Staff to direct targeting and battle damage assessment activities during Operation Enduring Freedom.

Early years 
Stillwagon was born in Milwaukee, Wisconsin, and raised in Cambridge Springs, Pennsylvania. He graduated from Cambridge Springs High School in 1980 and from the University of Pittsburgh in 1984. He was commissioned a second lieutenant upon graduating Officer Training School in July, 1985.

Education 
 1984 Bachelor of Arts degree in economics, University of Pittsburgh, Pittsburgh, Pa.
 1989 Squadron Officers School, by correspondence
 1992 Master of Public Administration degree, California State University Dominguez Hills, Carson, Calif.
 1998 Air Command and Staff College, by correspondence
 2003 Air War College, by correspondence
 2012 U.S. Air Force Leadership Enhancement Program, Center for Creative Leadership, Greensboro, N.C.
 2014 AFSO-21 Executive Leadership Course, University of Tennessee, Knoxville
 2014 Senior Leader Orientation Course, Joint Base Andrews, Md.

Assignments 
 August 1985 – March 1986, Student, Armed Forces Air Intelligence Technical Training Center, Lowry Air Force Base, Colo.
 March 1986 – August 1987, Chief, Target Processing Branch, 416th Bombardment Wing (Hvy), Griffiss Air Force Base, N.Y.
 August 1987 – December 1989, Assistant Chief, Target Intelligence Branch, 416th Bombardment Wing (Hvy), Griffiss AFB, N.Y.
 January 1990 – March 1991, Foreign Space Analyst, Headquarters Space Systems Division, Los Angeles AFB, Calif.
 March 1991 – June 1991, Chief Operations Intelligence Branch, Headquarters Space Systems Division, Los Angeles AFB, Calif.
 June 1991 – June 1992, Assistant Chief, Intelligence Support Division, Headquarters Space and Missile Systems Center, Los Angeles AFB, Calif.
 June 1992 – December 1992, Chief, Intelligence Support Division, Headquarters Space and Missile Systems Center, Los Angeles AFB, Calif.
 January 1993 – June 1996, Assistant Director of Intelligence, 129th Rescue Wing, Moffett Federal Airfield, Calif.

 July 1996 – September 1998, Director of Intelligence, 305th Rescue Squadron, Davis-Monthan AFB, Ariz. (May-Jul 1997. Chief of Intelligence, 939 RQW Deployed, Incirlik AB Turkey)

 October 1998 – November 1999, Eurasia Analyst, National Military Joint Intelligence Center, Pentagon, Washington, D.C.

 November 1999 – September 2001, Assistant Deputy Director for Intelligence, National Military Joint Intelligence Center, Pentagon, Washington, D.C.
 October 2001 – September 2002, Chief, Crisis Targeting and Battle Damage Assessment Cell (Operation Enduring Freedom), Joint Staff Directorate for Intelligence, J2, Pentagon, Washington, D.C.

 October 2002 – May 2004, Deputy Director for Intelligence, National Military Joint Intelligence Center, Pentagon, Washington, D.C.
 May 2004 – May 2005, Director of Operations, Joint Reserve Intelligence Unit, Joint Staff Directorate for Intelligence, J2, Pentagon, Washington, D.C.
 May 2005 – May 2006, Deputy Commander, Joint Reserve Intelligence Unit, Joint Staff Directorate for Intelligence, J2, Pentagon, Washington, D.C.
 June 2006 – June 2008, Director, Reserve ISR Forces, Defense Intelligence Agency, Washington, D.C.
 June 2008 – December 2009, Individual Mobilization Augmentee to the Commander, National Air and Space Intelligence Center, Wright Patterson AFB, Ohio
 January 2010 – February 2014, Mobilization Assistant to the Commander, Air Force Intelligence, Surveillance and Reconnaissance Agency, Joint Base San Antonio – Lackland AFB, Texas
 February 2014 – May 2017, Assistant Director of Intelligence, Headquarters U.S. European Command, Stuttgart-Vaihingen, Germany

Summary of joint assignments 
 October 1998 – November 1999, Eurasia Analyst, National Military Joint Intelligence Center, Joint Staff, Pentagon, Washington, D.C., as a major
 November 1999 – September 2001, Assistant Deputy Director for Intelligence, National Military Joint Intelligence Center, Joint Staff, the Pentagon, Washington, D.C., as a major and lieutenant colonel
 October 2001 – September 2002, Chief, Crisis Targeting and Battle Damage Assessment Cell (Operation Enduring Freedom), Directorate for Intelligence, J2, Joint Staff, the Pentagon, Washington, D.C., as a lieutenant colonel
 October 2002 – May 2004, Deputy Director for Intelligence, National Military Joint Intelligence Center, Joint Staff, Pentagon, Washington, D.C., as a lieutenant colonel and colonel
 May 2004 – May 2005, Director of Operations, Joint Reserve Intelligence Unit, Directorate for Intelligence, J2, Joint Staff, the Pentagon, Washington, D.C., as a colonel
 May 2005 – May 2006, Deputy Commander, Joint Reserve Intelligence Unit, Directorate for Intelligence, J2, Joint Staff, the Pentagon, Washington, D.C., as a colonel
 February 2014 – May 2017, Assistant Director of Intelligence, Headquarters U.S. European Command, Stuttgart-Vaihingen, Germany, as a brigadier general

Major awards and decorations

Effective dates of promotion

See also 

 United States Air Force generals

References 

Living people
United States Air Force generals
University of Pittsburgh alumni
Recipients of the Defense Superior Service Medal
United States Air Force reservists
Military personnel from Milwaukee
Military personnel from Pennsylvania
1962 births